"Babylonian Theodicy" is a poem written within ancient Babylonia. The poem is inscribed onto clay in the Middle-Babylonian language, which is a form of language dating to the period 1600 to 900 BC. The poem has also been referred to as "An Akkadian dialogue on the unrighteousness of the world or The Babylonian Koheleth."

Content
The poem is an example of wisdom literature, which is a form of writing which shows two people providing contrary positions on a subject, in the form of a dialogue.

The poem is a dialogue between two people who are friends. One of the persons is suffering, and the poem shows him revealing the acts of evil done by people in the society around him, while the other person is shown attempting to add perspective on these acts of dubious morality, by him stating the nature of the occurrence of justice within the order of everything that exists (in the universe), an order that exists because it was made by a divinity.

The first line reads:

and the speaker proceeds to recount first hand experiences and his grief, referred to as lumnu libbi which means, in literal translation, evil of the heart, but which in everyday lexicon might be called anguish or heartache, which is to say, a kind of emotional and psychological suffering. Having described his state of pain, the sufferer attributes this to an occurrence in his life, which is abandonment at an early age, when he was orphaned, in addition to which, he was abandoned and also deprived of any emotional and psychological support from another. The sufferer is confused and baffled by his suffering, and ultimately, the poem shows him failing to find any clarity as to why this misfortune in life should have befallen him. The sufferer hopes to gain a cathartic release purely by the act of anothers listening to his recounting of his tale of woe, if it is his companion might be amiable and therefore might provide of a form of compassion, the sufferer states, in the last stanza  (the translation made by Professor W.G.Lambert ):

and the last part of the last line reads:

The "Babylonian Theodicy" is, with regards to its dialogic nature of a sufferer and friend(s), formally very similar to the Book of Job in the Hebrew Bible.

Structural analysis
The poem is acrostic,  which means that the first syllabic sign of each line form words when read downwards,  and the poem, in terms of its structure, is made up of twenty seven stanzas (or verses in other words) with each stanza consisting of eleven lines.

The words constructed in the acrostic of the poem read:

Dating
According to one source, the earliest manuscripts showing this poem date from the Ashurbanipal library,  another source states the Theodicy originates slightly after the Kassite period, circa 1500-1100 B.C., more exactly, written apparently at about 1000 B.C.

See also
Adad-apla-iddina
Akkadian literature
Ancient literature
Ludlul bēl nēmeqi
Nebuchadnezzar I
Problem of evil (section Responses, defences and theodicies)
Šamaš
Theodicy

References

External links
 Babylonian Theodicy Critical edition and translation of the text (electronic Babylonian Library)
 Electronic Tools and Near East Archives – permalinked from ETANA

Akkadian literature